The Christchurch City Council is the local government authority for Christchurch  in New Zealand. It is a territorial authority elected to represent the  people of Christchurch. Since October 2022, the Mayor of Christchurch is Phil Mauger, who succeeded after the retirement of Lianne Dalziel. The council currently consists of 16 councillors elected from sixteen wards, and is presided over by the mayor, who is elected at large. The number of elected members and ward boundaries changed prior during the 2016 election.

History

As a result of the 1989 local government reforms, on 1 November 1989 Christchurch City Council took over the functions of the former Christchurch City Council, Heathcote County Council, Riccarton Borough Council, Waimairi District Council, part of Paparua County Council, and the Christchurch Drainage Board. On 6 March 2006, Banks Peninsula District Council merged with Christchurch City Council.

Councillor Yani Johanson campaigned since 2010 to live-stream council meetings for more transparency. Whilst the technology had been installed well before the 2013 local body election, it has only been used since the change in mayor.

Elections 
The Council is elected every three years using the first-past-the-post voting system. The vote is conducted by postal ballot. The 2016 elections had a turnout of 38.3% down from 42.9% and 52.2% in 2013 and 2010 respectively.

Prior to the 2004 local elections, there were 24 councillors in Christchurch. At that election, the number of councillors halved to 12. For electoral purposes, Christchurch was divided into six wards from 2004, and seven wards after the amalgamation with Banks Peninsula in 2006. The six metropolitan wards each elected two councillors, with the remaining councillor elected for the sparsely populated Banks Peninsula ward. The 2016 representation review by the Local Government Commission has resulted in 16 wards, with each ward electing one councillor, i.e. an increase in three councillors.

Political groupings represented on the Council are the centre-right Independent Citizens and the centre-left The People's Choice (formerly Christchurch 2021). Party politics are less influential in elections to the Council than is the case for the House of Representatives, with 10 Councillors elected on tickets and 7 elected as independents in 2019, including the Mayor.

Council members

2022–current
The composition of the council for the 2022 term is:

2019–2022
The composition of the council for the 2019–2022 term was:

2016–2019
The election held via postal vote on 8 October 2016, was the first to use the new wards as a result of the representation review.

Key features of the Local Government Commission's final decision included:

16 councillors, plus the Mayor, with one councillor elected from each of the 16 wards (a change from the current 13 councillors elected from six wards, each with two members, apart from Banks Peninsula, which current has a single member)
Banks Peninsula Ward stays as it is
Six urban community boards
One Banks Peninsula community board
Overall, the number of elected members stays the same as present, at 54.

2013–2016
Five of the thirteen councillors did not stand for re-election in 2013. Another four councillors failed to get re-elected (deputy-mayor Ngaire Button, Helen Broughton, Claudia Reid, and Aaron Keown). Hence, only four councillor were returned for another term (Yani Johanson, Jimmy Chen, Glenn Livingstone, and Jamie Gough), to be joined by nine new members plus a new mayor. For the 2013–2016 term, the composition of the Council is as follows:

2010–2013
During the 2010–2013 term, the composition of the Council was as shown in the table below. The Press in an editorial described the situation during the three years as often "tumultuous" and there were many calls for a cleanout of elected members at the 2013 local body elections. During the term, the government appointed an overseer to council (Kerry Marshall) and "came within an ace of sacking the council completely." Five city councillors (Sue Wells, Barry Corbett, Sally Buck, Tim Carter, and Peter Beck) and the mayor (Bob Parker) did not stand for re-election.

Organisation

Mayor, council and committees 

Under most circumstances, the Council is presided over by the Mayor. At its first meeting after a local election, the Council elects from among its members a Deputy Mayor, who acts as Mayor in the absence and with the consent, or in the incapacity, of the Mayor. The Deputy Mayor also presides at meetings if the Mayor is not present. The Deputy Mayor is recommended by the Mayor and is either confirmed or replaced in a vote of the first council meeting.

Councillors also serve on a number of committees. , there is one Standing Committee, eight Standing Subcommittees, seven Joint Standing Committees and Working Parties (so called because they involve members of other local authorities), and 14 ad hoc subcommittees and working parties. The Council can delegate certain powers to these committees, or alternatively they can consider matters in more detail and make recommendations to the full Council.

Community boards 
The Council has established six community boards. These community boards deal with matters delegated to them by the Council, act as representatives and advocates for their communities, and interact with community organisations and interest groups. General tasks typically delegated to local community boards are the locations of Council rubbish bins, traffic lights, stop signs and pedestrian crossings; Also rubbish collection, local disturbance review and relaying information to the main council from their Ward area through the Councillor who has a right to sit on the Board within their ward.

Some community boards, like the Council, have created committees for specific purposes.

As of the 2022 local elections, the members of the community boards are:

Te Pātaka o Rākaihautū Banks Peninsula Community Board         

Waitai Coastal-Burwood-Linwood Community Board         

Waimāero Fendalton-Waimairi-Harewood Community Board  

Waipuna Halswell-Hornby-Riccarton Community Board

Waipapa Papanui-Innes-Central Community Board

Waihoro Spreydon-Cashmere-Heathcote Community Board

Organisational support 
The day-to-day administration of the City of Christchurch is carried out by a large team of Council staff. Indeed, in everyday usage, the term the council is extended to include not just the Mayor and Councillors, but the entire local civil service. The professional head of the civil service is the Chief Executive, who is appointed by the Council under contract for up to five years. The Chief Executive is assisted by eight General Managers, each with his or her own portfolio.

In early July 2013, CEO Tony Marryatt was put on indefinite leave on full pay over the council losing its accreditation with International Accreditation New Zealand (IANZ) to issue building consents, one of council's core functions. General manager Jane Parfitt was appointed acting CEO. Karleen Edwards was chief executive from June 2014 to June 2019. In July 2019, she was succeeded by Dawn Baxendale.

Mayor and executive team

Christchurch had surprisingly few town clerks, later called general manager and today chief executive, since the establishment of the role in 1862.

List of town clerks, now Chief Executives

Responsibilities and services 

The Council is vested with a power of "general competence" for the social, economic and cultural well-being of Christchurch. In particular, the Council has responsibility for a range of local services, including roads (except State Highways), water, sewerage, waste collection, parks and reserves, and libraries. Urban development is managed through the maintenance of a city plan and associated zoning regulations, together with building and resource consents. The Council has been given extra powers to regulate certain types of business operations, notably suppliers of alcohol and brothels.

Building consents 
One of the core functions of the council is to check and approve building consents. With effect from 8 July 2013, Christchurch City Council has been stripped of its accreditation for issuing building consents. This comes in the middle of a rebuild period following the devastating February 2011 Christchurch earthquake. City Councillors found out earlier in June through the media that International Accreditation New Zealand (IANZ) had written to Council and threatened to withdraw accreditation, with Council's chief executive officer, Tony Marryatt, replying that mayor "Parker and other councillors were kept in the dark because he was confident staff were addressing issues raised by IANZ, and that the June 28 deadline would be met." A Crown manager, Doug Martin, has been installed to reform the council's consenting department. Marryatt lost his job over the affair, but will stay on the payroll until November 2013 and will receive a total of $500,000 before he leaves. Parker, who had backed the controversial CEO over the years, took his part of the responsibility and decided not to stand for re-election for a third term as mayor.

Kerbside waste collection 
Christchurch has a wheelie bin kerbside collection system, which replaced their previous system. The previous system required the resident to put a black rubbish bag out every week to the kerbside, along with a green recycling crate. With the current system, residents are given three wheelie bins: One 240 litre bin (recycling), One 140 litre bin (rubbish), and one 80 litre bin (organics). Each week, residents can put two of the three bins out. The 80 litre organics bin goes out every week and the 240 litre recycling and the 140 litre rubbish alternate.

Christchurch City Libraries

The Shuttle
Whilst public transport is the responsibility of regional councils, the Christchurch City Council provided a free central city service. The Shuttle operated from December 1998 to February 2011 and came to an end with the main earthquake.

Offices 

1862–1887
The Christchurch Municipal Council, as it was originally called, was using the Christchurch Land Office, the first public building erected in Christchurch in 1851.

1887–1924
On the same site, the council had the so far only purpose-built council chambers constructed, designed by Samuel Hurst Seager in a Queen Anne style. The building became known as Our City and is registered as a Category I heritage building with Heritage New Zealand (NZHPT).

1924–1980
Council purchased the burned out shell of the former Canterbury Hall and built new civic offices in Manchester Street. Later known as the Civic, the building was registered as a Category II heritage building with the NZHPT, and was demolished after the 2011 Christchurch earthquake.

1980–2010
Council bought the former Miller's Department Store and moved to 163 Tuam Street in 1980. This gave rise to the occasional metonymic use of Tuam Street to refer to the municipal government. The building was registered as a Category II heritage building with the NZHPT, and was demolished after the 2011 Christchurch earthquake.

2010 to present
In August 2010, the Council's new offices were officially opened in a refurbishment of the former Christchurch Mail Sorting Centre, designed by the Ministry of Works in 1974. The redevelopment was supervised by Wellington-based architect Ian Athfield.

The council also maintains service centres in the suburbs of Fendalton, Linwood, Papanui, Riccarton, Shirley, Sockburn and Sydenham, and in the towns of Lyttelton, Little River and Akaroa.

See also 
 Christchurch City Holdings, a wholly owned investment arm of the Christchurch City Council
 Coat of arms of the City of Christchurch, granted to the Christchurch City Council in 1949

References

External links 

 Christchurch City Council website

Organisations based in Christchurch
Politics of Christchurch
City councils in New Zealand
1862 establishments in New Zealand